The 1942 South Dakota gubernatorial election was held on November 3, 1942. Incumbent Republican Governor Harlan J. Bushfield declined to seek re-election to a third term and instead successfully ran for the U.S. Senate. A crowded Republican primary developed to succeed him, and because no candidate received 35% of the vote, the nomination was decided at the state Republican convention, where former Attorney General Merrell Q. Sharpe, the second-place finisher in the primary, won the nomination. In the general election, Sharpe faced Democratic nominee Lewis W. Bicknell, the 1940 Democratic nominee for Governor. Aided by the national Republican landslide, Sharpe defeated Bicknell in a landslide.

Democratic Primary
Lewis W. Bicknell—a former Day County State's Attorney, former Chairman of the State Department of Public Welfare, and the 1940 Democratic nominee for Governor—announced that he would again run for Governor. He was the only Democratic candidate to file and he won the Democratic nomination for Governor unopposed, thereby removing the race from the primary ballot.

Republican Primary

Candidates
 Joseph H. Bottum, State Director of Taxation, former Faulk County State's Attorney
 Merrell Q. Sharpe, former Attorney General of South Dakota
 Leo A. Temmey, Attorney General of South Dakota
 Millard G. Scott, State Rural Credit Director

Campaign
At the May 5, 1942, primary, all four candidates ended up with vote totals that were within six thousand votes of each other, and for the first time since 1930, no candidate received the requisite 35% of the vote. Merrell Q. Sharpe, who ran on a reform, "oust the state house" platform, was seen by many observers as having a lead coming into the convention, despite placing second in the primary. There was speculation that Sharpe's three other opponents would consolidate their forces to defeat him at the convention, but uncertainty as to whether they would do so. Influential state Republicans, chief among them Governor Bushfield, declined to publicly intervene. At the convention, Sharpe took an early lead, and despite the speculation about anti-Sharpe consolidation, as Temmey and Scott collapsed, the vast majority of their votes went to Sharpe, not Bottom. On the third ballot, with Temmey's support halved and Scott's near zero, Sharpe easily won a majority, earning himself the nomination.

Primary election results

Convention results

General election

Results

References

South Dakota
1942
Gubernatorial
November 1942 events